Robert G. (Bob) Chambers (1924 – 17 December 2016) was a British physicist. He won the 1994 Hughes Medal of the Royal Society "for his many contributions to solid-state physics, in particular his ingenious and technically demanding experiment which verified the Aharonov–Bohm effect concerning the behaviour of charged particles in magnetic fields"

References

External links
Professor Robert G. Chambers, 1924-2016, School of Physics, University of Bristol

1924 births
2016 deaths
Academics of the University of Bristol
British physicists
Place of birth missing
Fellows of the American Physical Society